Kevin Hagan (born 11 August 1957) is an association football player who represented New Zealand at international level.

Career

His senior career began with Napier City Rovers and was followed by stints at Auckland clubs Manurewa and North Shore United in the New Zealand National League, before he moved to Australia to join St George Saints in the National Soccer League. He later played for APIA Leichhardt, Sydney Olympic and Wollongong Wolves.

Hagan scored on his full All Whites debut, a 5–0 win over Fiji on 3 June 1985 and ended his international playing career with 11 A-international caps and 5 goals to his credit, scoring 4 in his final appearance, in a 12–0 win over Samoa on 13 November 1987.

References

External links

1957 births
Living people
New Zealand association footballers
New Zealand international footballers
National Soccer League (Australia) players
Napier City Rovers FC players
Manurewa AFC players
APIA Leichhardt FC players
Sydney Olympic FC players
Wollongong Wolves FC players
Association football forwards